Põdrala Parish was a rural municipality of the Estonian county of Valga.

Settlements
Villages
Karu - Kaubi - Kungi - Leebiku - Liva - Lõve - Pikasilla - Pori - Reti - Riidaja - Rulli - Uralaane - Vanamõisa - Voorbahi

References